Alexandre Bompard (born 4 October 1972) is a French businessman. He became CEO of the retail chain Fnac in 2011. Since July 2017, he has also been chairman and CEO of Carrefour.

Early life 
Alexandre Bompard was born on 4 October 1972 in Saint-Étienne, France. As the son of Alain Bompard, a businessman and president of the AS Saint-Étienne football club from 1997 to 2003, he was exposed to the business world at a young age.

He earned degrees from two Parisian institutions: the Paris Institute of Political Studies and the National School of Administration (Cyrano de Bergerac class).

Career
Upon graduation, he joined the Inspection Générale des Finances. There, he served as a junior inspector until 1999 before being promoted to finance inspector in 2002. After serving as a project manager for the chief director of the Inspection Générale des Finances, he became a technical advisor to François Fillon, then Minister of Social Affairs, Labour and Solidarity in 2003.

He joined French broadcaster Canal+ in 2004 as the chief of staff for the group's president, Bertrand Meheut, and in June 2005, was appointed director of the sports department.

In 2008, he joined Europe 1 as the radio station's chairman and CEO.

In November 2010, he became CEO of French retail chain Fnac. In 2013, Bompard was in charge of listing the company and splitting Fnac from Kering, allowing the holding company to focus on luxury brands, while aiming to create growth autonomously.

Bompard joined Carrefour as CEO in July 2017. In January 2018, he announced a strategic plan for the company, entitled "Carrefour 2022", with ambitions to make Carrefour the "leader of the food transition for all". The plan includes measures for better food and package sustainability, limitation of food waste, development of bioproducts, e-commerce partnerships, two billion euros in annual investments from 2018 as well as organisational and cost reduction measures.

In the context of the COVID-19 pandemic, Bompard  granted 85,000 employees at work and exposed in France a bonus of €1,000, and will waive 25% of his fixed salary for a period of two months.

Until the end of 2020, Bompard and all of Carrefour's board of directors have decided to waive 25% of their director's fees, to finance solidarity actions for the company's employees.

Personal life
He is married to Charlotte Bompard, the vice president of Bobigny's High Court, and they have three daughters.

References 

1972 births
Living people
Carrefour people
Sciences Po alumni
École nationale d'administration alumni
French chief executives
People from Saint-Étienne